Tselios is a surname. Notable people with the surname include:

Alexandra Tselios, Australian entrepreneur, social commentator and business columnist
Athanasios Tselios (born 1956), Greek retired Hellenic Army officer
Ilias Tselios (born 1997), Greek footballer 
Nikos Tselios (born 1979), American professional ice hockey player
Paraskevas Tselios (born 1997), Greek male volleyball player